Valle de Guadalupe is a village in Jalisco, Mexico. The population of the village is 6,705.

References

Populated places in Jalisco